John Sealey (born 27 December 1945) is an English former professional footballer who played as a winger in The Football League for Liverpool and Chester.

Playing career
Sealey began his career playing as an amateur for non-league side Warrington Town, before he moved to Liverpool in 1963 for a fee of £25. His solitary appearance came in Liverpool's final game of the 1964–65 season. He scored in Liverpool's 3–1 win at Wolverhampton Wanderers in Division One but was not selected again.

In June 1966, Sealey, John Bennett and Alan Hignett all moved from Liverpool to Chester on free transfers. Sealey made his debut in the second league game of the season, a 3–0 home defeat by Bradford Park Avenue and played in the following two games. Sealey's only other first-team games for Chester were not until January 1968, when he made substitute appearances in a Welsh Cup tie against Bangor City and a Division Four match at Exeter City.

This marked the end of his Chester playing career and he joined Wigan Athletic, where he made 22 league appearances. He later moved on to Winsford United and, in November 1969, to Nantwich Town. Sealey had to retire from football due to a serious knee injury from which he never to recovered.

References

External links
Liverpool FC player history profile
Article on players who played for Chester and Liverpool

1945 births
Living people
English footballers
English Football League players
Association football wingers
People from Wallasey
Liverpool F.C. players
Chester City F.C. players
Wigan Athletic F.C. players
Warrington Town F.C. players
Winsford United F.C. players
Nantwich Town F.C. players